Johnny Blake Peterson (September 12, 1960 – January 20, 1993) was an American murderer and suspected serial killer who was posthumously linked via DNA to two murders committed in his native city of Las Vegas, Nevada from 1979 to 1983. He was never considered a suspect in either killing during his lifetime, and died in hospital from an overdose in 1993. Since his identification in 2021, authorities have announced that they are investigating him in at least five other murders in the Las Vegas area, beginning in the late 1970s.

Life
Born on September 12, 1960, in Las Vegas, Peterson was one of several children and attended the Western High School. After graduating, he worked as a freelance plasterer, got married and had two children. It is known that he was arrested for rape at some point during his lifetime, but it is unclear if he served time for this offence. On January 20, 1993, he was admitted to the University Medical Center of Southern Nevada due to a drug overdose and died later that same day.

Murders
On January 29, 1979, 16-year-old Kim Bryant, a high school student at Western High School, was waiting at a Dairy Queen across her school when she was abducted by Peterson, who drove away with her in his vehicle. Her body was found less than a month later by a trio of teenagers hunting with BB guns in the area, who immediately notified the authorities. Other sources claim that her body was found by motorcyclists riding in the desert, and that her personal belongings had been scattered about the area. 

Upon conducting interviews with her classmates, authorities learned that several of them had been approached by two strangers driving a silver-painted 1950s Chevrolet with primer spots and raised back wheels, who attempted to entice them into their car with offers to sell them jewelry. According to their description, one of them appeared to be a young man of no more than 19 with shaggy blond hair and droopy eyes, which would have fitted Peterson's description at the time. However, it is currently unclear if he was one of the two men or if this incident has any relation to the murder of Bryant.

On December 30, 1983, 22-year-old Diana Hanson, a college student who was visiting her family for the holidays, went out to jog in the western parts of Las Vegas. Somewhere along the way, she was intercepted by Peterson, who sexually assaulted and stabbed her to death. Her body was found the following day by a man picking up firewood. As there was little evidence that could lead to an arrest, both cases went cold and remained unsolved for the decades.

Identification
In the early 2020s, Las Vegas-based philanthropist Justin Woo donated $5,000 to raise funds for the cold cases to be reopened. Local detectives gathered enough DNA evidence from the Bryant case to send it for testing at Othram. On November 29, 2021, they announced Peterson's DNA had officially been linked to the case, cementing him as the likely perpetrator.

Not long after, an anonymous acquaintance of Peterson contacted investigators and informed them that he might have been involved in another murder: that of Diana Hanson. In order to learn whether this was true, Peterson's DNA was compared to that collected in the Hanson case, and only two weeks later, it resulted in a positive match. Because of this, he was declared as responsible for her murder as well, and both cases were officially closed.

Las Vegas police have announced that they are investigating him in at least five additional murders committed in the area during the late 1970s and early 1980s. They have emphasized that so far he remains only a suspect, and have advised against labelling him a "serial killer" until DNA testing has officially finished. 

In the aftermath of the identifications, surviving members from both victims' families have given interviews in which they expressed their gratitude to Othram, the Las Vegas Police Department and to Justin Woo for helping solve Bryant and Hanson's murders.

See also
 Othram

References

External links
 FindAGrave

1960 births
1993 deaths
20th-century American criminals
American male criminals
American murderers of children
Criminals from Nevada
People from Las Vegas
Suspected serial killers
Violence against women in the United States